Epipristis rufilunata is a moth of the family Geometridae first described by William Warren in 1903. It is found on New Guinea and the Bismarck Islands.

Subspecies
Epipristis rufilunata rufilunata
Epipristis rufilunata antelucana Prout, 1927

References

Moths described in 1903
Pseudoterpnini